John Bulteel may refer to:

 John Bulteel (died 1669), Member of Parliament (MP) for Lostwithiel
 John Bulteel (writer) (1627–1692), his cousin, English writer and translator
 John Crocker Bulteel (1793–1843), MP for South Devon

See also
 Bulteel, a surname